The following is a list of awards and nominations received by English film director and producer Sir Alfred Hitchcock, chronicling his achievements in the film industry.

The six-time Academy Award-nominee and four-time Emmy nominee won eight Golden Laurel Awards, two Golden Globes, the Irving G. Thalberg Memorial Award, the AFI Life Achievement Award, the Directors Guild of America Award, the Film Society of Lincoln Center's Gala Tribute Award, the National Board of Review of Motion Pictures Award, the New York Film Critics Circle Award, and the Saturn Award. In England, Hitchcock was honored by the BAFTA Academy Fellowship Award and made a Knight Commander of the Order of the British Empire by the Queen Elizabeth II. Apart from his three Cannes Film Festival nominations, he also received two Silver Shell Awards at San Sebastián International Film Festival in Spain, the Jussi Award in Finland, the Kinema Junpo Award in Japan, the Mention Award at Locarno International Film Festival in Switzerland, and at Venice Film Festival in Italy a Golden Lion nomination. In addition, eight movies directed by Hitchcock were inducted into the National Film Registry and four of them are listed in the American Film Institute list of the 100 greatest American movies of all time (along with Vertigo, which was ranked as the Best Mystery Movie Ever). Two other his pictures entered the list of the 100 Greatest British Films of the 20th Century, released by British Film Institute in UK.

Awards and nominations

Academy Awards
The Academy Awards, commonly referred to as the Oscar, is an annual ceremony established by the American Academy of Motion Picture Arts and Sciences (AMPAS) to recognize excellence of professionals in the film industry, including directors, actors, and writers. Sixteen films directed by Hitchcock received an Oscar nomination, though only five of those were assigned to him. Along with Robert Altman, Clarence Brown and King Vidor, he is tied for the most nominations in the category of Best Director – five apiece – without a win. However, four of his films also earned Best Picture nominations (Foreign Correspondent in 1941, Suspicion in 1942 and Spellbound in 1946, plus winning Rebecca from 1941). The total number of Oscar nominations (including winners) earned by films he directed is fifty.

Irving G. Thalberg Memorial Award
Since 1938, the Irving G. Thalberg Memorial Award has been bestowed during the Academy Awards ceremonies to film producers, which are voted by the Academy's Board of Governors. The prize, named after a head of the Production Division of Metro-Goldwyn-Mayer, is not given each year (in earlier years, some individuals were honored more than once). Rather than the familiar "Oscar" statuette, its trophy is in the form of a solid bronze bust of Thalberg. Hitchcock was awarded in 1968. His acceptance speech, in its entirety, was "Thank you... very much indeed."

American Film Institute
The American Film Institute was founded by the National Endowment for the Arts as an independent non-profit organization focused on screen education and the recognition and celebration of excellence in the art of film, television and digital media. In 1973, AFI Life Achievement Award was created to honor a single individual for his or her lifetime contribution to enriching American culture through motion pictures and television. Following John Ford, James Cagney, Orson Welles, William Wyler, Bette Davis and Henry Fonda, Hitchcock was honored on 7 March 1979.

AFI's 100 Years...100 Movies
AFI's 100 Years…100 Movies is a list determined by the American Film Institute that, in a three-hour television event, counted down the 100 greatest American movies of all time.
from a poll of more than 1,500 artists and leaders in the film industry who chose the 100-best films in 1998. In total four movies directed by Hitchcock entered the list.

AFI's 100 Years...100 Movies (10th Anniversary)
To update for the new generation of films released from 1996 to 2006, an updated version of the list billed as an AFI's 100 Years... 100 Movies was released in June 2007. (AFI will conduct different versions of this poll every ten years.) While Steven Spielberg has the most films of any director on the list at five films, Stanley Kubrick, Billy Wilder and Hitchcock tie for 2nd place with four of their films making the list.

AFI's 10 Top 10 Mystery Movies
In 2008, AFI's 10 Top 10 honored the ten greatest American films in ten classic film genres, featuring animation, fantasy, gangster, science fiction, western, sports, mystery, romantic comedy, courtroom drama and epic. Hitchcock's Vertigo was named as the best mystery film of all time, having entered the AFI's Top 10 list also with three other pictures in addition. (AFI defines "mystery" as a genre that revolves around the solution of a crime).

British Academy Film Awards
The British Academy Film Awards are presented in an annual award show hosted by the British Academy of Film and Television Arts (BAFTA), as the British equivalent of the Oscars. The ceremony used to take place in April or May, but from 2002 onwards it takes place in February in order to precede the U.S. Academy Awards. In recognition of outstanding achievement in the art forms of the moving image, the BAFTA Academy Fellowship Award is given, which is the highest honour the Academy can bestow. Hitchcock as the very first awardee received the lifetime achievement award in 1971.

British Film Institute

BFI Top 100 British films
In 1999, the BFI Top 100 British films list of the greatest movies of Cinema of the United Kingdom of the 20th century was produced by the charitable organisation British Film Institute (BFI), and voters were asked to choose up to 'culturally British' 100 films. Two of Hitchcock's movies entered the selection.

Cannes Film Festival
The Cannes Film Festival is the most prestigious film festival in the world founded in 1946, which is held annually (usually each May). The ceremony takes place at the Palais des Festivals et des Congrès, in Cannes located in the south of France. The highest prize awarded at the festival is currently known as Palme d'Or (previously recognized as the Grand Prix du Festival), and it is presented to the director of the best feature film of the official competition. Overall, Hitchcock received three nominations (in 1946, 1953 and 1956).

Directors Guild of America
From 1936, the Directors Guild of America Awards are issued annually by the labor union Directors Guild of America (DGA). The group, formerly identified as Screen Directors Guild, represents the interests of film and television directors in the United States motion picture industry. Lifetime Achievement Award was originally called the D.W. Griffith Lifetime Achievement Award, and it is given since 1953. Hitchcock received the honor in 1968.

Emmy Awards
The Emmy Awards, considered as the TV equivalent to the Academy Awards (for film) in U.S., are presented by Academy of Television Arts & Sciences (ATAS), National Academy of Television Arts & Sciences (NATAS) and International Academy of Television Arts & Sciences, in various sectors of the television industry, including entertainment programming, news and documentary shows. Hitchcock was nominated four times – twice as a director of episodes for Alfred Hitchcock Presents series, while two times as a TV personality.

Film Society of Lincoln Center
The Film Society of Lincoln Center (FSLC) is a film presentation organization founded in 1969 that, as one of the twelve resident organizations at the Lincoln Center for the Performing Arts, runs annual The Chaplin Award (initially called Gala Tribute) to honor legendary stars and industry leaders at the Lincoln Center's Avery Fisher Hall. After Charlie Chaplin and Fred Astaire, Hitchcock became the third awardee (in 1974).

Golden Globes
The Golden Globe Award is an accolade presented by the members of the Hollywood Foreign Press Association (HFPA) to recognize excellence in film and television, both domestic and foreign. The formal ceremonies are presented annually as a major part of the film industry's awards season, culminating each year with the Oscars. Hitchcock won twice.

Cecil B. DeMille Award
The Cecil B. DeMille Award is an annual lifetime achievement award that was named in honor of one of the industry's most successful filmmakers. The honor is given by the Hollywood Foreign Press Association during the Golden Globe Award ceremonies in Hollywood.

Jussi Award
The Jussi Award is a Finnish equivalent to American Oscars, to recognize excellence of professionals in the film industry in Finland (including film directors, actors and/or writers). The event was formed by Filmiaura society that count up to 260 film professionals who vote for all the categories, except Public Favorite. Hitchcock

Kinema Junpo
The Kinema Junpo (respectively キネマ旬報) is the oldest Japanese film magazine founded by a group of four Tokyo Institute of Technology students in 1919. Although, the publication serves as a trade journal, reporting on the film industry and announcing new films and trends in Japan, it initially specialized in covering mostly foreign films. Hitchcock held an award in the international category.

Laurel Awards
The Golden Laurel aka Laurel Awards was an American-Canadian film award organized by Motion Picture Exhibitor magazine that honored pictures, actors, directors and composers. Out of thirteen released annual editions, Hitchcock was nominated each year, winning eight times eventually, while four times he was ranked as the second as Best Producer/Director.

Locarno International Film Festival
Since 1946, Locarno International Film Festival is altogether with Karlovy Vary IFF considered as one of the oldest film festivals (after Cannes FF and Venice FF). It is held annually in the small Swiss-Italian town. Directors in the process of getting an international reputation are allowed to be entered in the competitive selection and the main prize went under many variations until it was named Golden Leopard. Hitchcock received the Mention award in 1950.

National Board of Review of Motion Pictures
The National Board of Review of Motion Pictures (NBR MP) was founded in 1909 as a censorship organization originally recognized as New York Board of Motion Picture Censorship in New York City. The society also works to foster commentary on all aspects of film production, as well as underwriting educational film programs and seminars for film students. Hitchcock won the NBR award in 1970.

National Film Registry
The National Film Registry (NFR) was established by the National Film Preservation Board in 1988 to preserve "culturally, historically, or aesthetically significant films"of the Cinema of the United States. Each year 25 are selected, of which each must be at least ten years old to be eligible for inclusion. For the first selection in 1989, the public nominated almost 1,000 films for consideration (including Vertigo). By now, nine of Hitchcock's films have been inducted by the board members.

New York Film Critics Circle
The New York Film Critics Circle (NYFCC) annually honors excellence in cinema worldwide by an organization of film reviewers from New York City publications since 1935. The ceremony is held on December of each year, in part as a response to the Academy Awards. Hitchcock won once in 1939.

Order of the British Empire
The order of chivalry Order of the British Empire, which was established by George V of the United Kingdom to fill gaps in the British honours system. The honorary title comprises five classes in civil and military divisions, the top two of which allow the recipient to use the title "Sir" (male) or "Dame" (female) before their first name. Alfred Hitchcock was first offered a CBE in 1962, but declined the award. Eventually, Hitchcock accepted the appointment as Knight Commander of the Order of the British Empire by Queen Elizabeth II in the 1980 New Year Honours. Although he had adopted American citizenship in 1956, he was entitled to use the title "Sir" because he had remained a British subject. Hitchcock died just four months later, on 29 April, before he could be formally invested.

San Sebastián International Film Festival
The San Sebastián International Film Festival (SS IFF) is a Spanish film fest, which was originally established to award Spanish language films in 1953 in San Sebastián (officially Donostia-San Sebastián). An international jury evaluates the films in the official section awarding several prizes, including the main Golden Shell award. Two of Hitchcock's movies won a Silver Shell award.

Saturn Awards
The Academy of Science Fiction, Fantasy & Horror Films (ASFFF) presents each year the Saturn Awards, which honor the top works in science fiction, fantasy, and horror in film, television and home video since 1972. Hitchcock was awarded posthumously in 1994.

Venice Film Festival
Founded in 1932 as the Esposizione Internazionale d'Arte Cinematografica, the Venice Film Festival is the oldest such event in the world. As part of the major biennial exhibition and festival for contemporary art called Venice Biennale, the fest takes place on the island of the Lido in Venice, Italy. The highest given prize is the Golden Lion, which is regarded as one of the film industry's most distinguished award. Hitchcock was nominated in 1955.

Hollywood Walk of Fame
The Hollywood Walk of Fame as one of the most successful marketing ideas ever produced is administered by the Hollywood Chamber of Commerce. The stars (located on both sides of
Hollywood Boulevard and Vine Street in the district of Los Angeles, California) are permanent public monuments to various artists for their achievement in the entertainment industry, as well as to fictional characters. Hitchcock received two stars – one with the symbol of classic film camera representing his motion pictures, and one with the television set emblem for his contribution to broadcast television, both on 8 February 1960.

See also
Alfred Hitchcock filmography
List of Alfred Hitchcock cameo appearances
Themes and plot devices in the films of Alfred Hitchcock

Notes

A  Rebecca won the Academy Award for Outstanding Production (now called the Best Picture category) though the award went the production company Selznick International Pictures not Hitchcock himself.
B  Won John Ford for his direction of The Grapes of Wrath.
C  While the movie was produced by Hitchcock and Harry E. Edington (both uncredited), Joan Fontaine earned for her role of Lina McLaidlaw in Suspicion the Academy Award for Best Actress, as the only Oscar–winning performance under Hitchcock's direction.
D  Won Darryl F. Zanuck's movie How Green Was My Valley, eventually.
E  Won Leo McCarey for his direction of Going My Way.
F  Miklós Rózsa received the Oscar for Best Original Score in a Dramatic or Comedy Picture.
G  Won Billy Wilder for his direction of The Lost Weekend.
H  Won Elia Kazan for his direction of On the Waterfront.
I  Won Billy Wilder for his direction of The Apartment.
J  Won Citizen Kane directed by Orson Welles.
K  Won The Third Man directed by Carol Reed.
L  Ironically, overall twelve directors but Hitchcock won the prize. Alf Sjöberg for Iris and the Lieutenant (Iris och löjtnantshjärta), Billy Wilder for The Lost Weekend, Bodil Ipsen and Lau Lauritzen Jr. for The Red Meadows (De røde enge), David Lean for Brief Encounter, Emilio Fernández for Portrait of Maria (María Candelaria Xochimilco), Chetan Anand for Neecha Nagar (नीचा नगर), Fridrikh Ermler for The Turning Point (Великий перелом, Velikiy perelom), Jean Delannoy for La symphonie pastorale, Leopold Lindtberg for The Last Chance (Die Letzte Chance), František Čáp for Men Without Wings (Muži bez křídel), and Roberto Rossellini for Rome, Open City (Roma, città aperta).

M  Won Henri-Georges Clouzot for his direction of The Wages of Fear (Le salaire de la peur).
N  Won Jacques-Yves Cousteau and Louis Malle for their film The Silent World (Le monde du silence).
O  Won Nat Hiken for his episode "You'll Never Get Rich" from The Phil Silvers Show (CBS).
P  Won Perry Como (NBC).
Q  Won Jack Smight for his episode "Eddie" directed for Alcoa Theatre (NBC).
R  Hitchcock shared the prize with Eddie Fisher (Coke Time), Jack Benny, and Mike Wallace (The Big Surprise).
S  The film was also nominated in the category Best Motion Picture – Drama but lost in favor of The Godfather by Francis Ford Coppola.
T  Won Francis Ford Coppola for his direction of The Godfather.
U  Won Cecil B. DeMille. Hitchcock was ranked as the 2nd top Producer/Director.
V  Won Billy Wilder. Hitchcock was the second.
W  Won Mervyn LeRoy. Hitchcock was the second.
X  Won Robert Wise. Hitchcock was the second.
Y  Won Robert Wise. Hitchcock finished as the sixth, following also Stanley Kramer, Blake Edwards, Robert Aldrich, and George Stevens.
Z  Hitchcock shares the prize with Luciano Emmer (for Domenica d'agosto), Ronald Neame (for Golden Salamander) and A. E. Wittlin (for Dankalia).
1  The prize was shared with Mario Monicelli (for I soliti ignoti).
2  The award was shared with Folco Quilici (for Dagli Appennini alle Ande).
3  Won Ordet by Danish director Carl Theodor Dreyer.
4  The star is located at 6506 Hollywood Blvd.
5  The star is located at 7013 Hollywood Blvd.

References

External links
 
 
 

Awards
Lists of awards received by film director